Bout Changes 'n' Things is an album by folk singer Eric Andersen, released in 1966.

Track listing 
All songs by Eric Andersen unless otherwise noted.
 "Violets of Dawn" – 3:50
 "The Girl I Love" – 3:00
 "That's All Right Mama" (Arthur Crudup) – 2:28
 "Thirsty Boots" – 5:55
 "The Hustler" – 4:02
 "Cross Your Mind" – 4:57
 "I Shall Go Unbounded" – 6:14
 "Champion at Keeping Them Rolling" (Ewan MacColl, Traditional) – 2:43
 "Hey Babe, Have You Been Cheatin'" – 3:08
 "Blind Fiddler" – 5:12
 "Close the Door Lightly When You Go" – 3:30
 "My Land Is a Good Land" – 2:58

Personnel

Musicians
 Eric Andersen – lead vocals, guitar, harmonica, liner notes
 Harvey Brooks – electric bass on "That's Alright Mama" and "The Hustler"
 Debbie Green – second guitar on "Violets of Dawn" and "Close the Door Lightly When You Go"

Technical
 Patrick Sky – producer
 Jules Halfant – design
 Joel Brodsky – photography
 Kieron Tyler – liner notes

References 

1966 albums
Eric Andersen albums
Vanguard Records albums
Albums with cover art by Joel Brodsky